Bjørnfjell Station is a railway station in the village of Bjørnfjell in the municipality of Narvik in Nordland county, Norway. It is located along the Ofotbanen railway line, between Søsterbekk Station and Riksgränsen Station (which is in Sweden).

The Swedish Iron Ore Line was extended to the town of Narvik in 1902. Increased traffic made a new station between Katterat Station (then Hundalen Station) and the Swedish border desirable, and the Old Bjørnfjell Station was opened in the fall of 1913. The present Bjørnfjell Station, located further east, was opened in 1925. The old station continued to exist as a stop until 1956.

Bjørnfjell, which means "Bear Mountain" in Norwegian, is also the name of the mountain (peak elevation 760 meters) near which the station is located.  The European route E10 highway passes through the Bjørnfjell area.

References

Narvik
Railway stations on the Ofoten Line
Railway stations in Narvik
Railway stations opened in 1925
1925 establishments in Norway